Albuna fraxini, the Virginia creeper clearwing, is a moth of the family Sesiidae. It is known from the northern United States and southern Canada.

The wingspan is about 18 mm. Adults are on wing from June to August. Adults generally only live for a week. 
Females emit pheromones to attract mates soon after emerging from pupae. 

The larvae feed on Virginia creeper, white, red, green, and European ash, and sometimes mountain-ash.

References

Sesiidae
Moths described in 1881